Begum Ra'ana Liaqat Ali Khan (known as Gul-i-Rana; 13 February 1905 – 13 June 1990) was the First Lady of Pakistan from 1947 to 1951 as the wife of Liaquat Ali Khan who served as the 1st Prime Minister of Pakistan. She was also the first female and tenth governor of Sindh. She was one of the leading woman figures in the Pakistan Movement, and a career economist, and prominent stateswoman from the start of the cold war till the fall and the end of the cold war.

She was one of the leading women politicians and nationwide respected female personalities witnessed key major events in Pakistan. She was one of the leading and pioneering women figures in the Pakistan Movement and served as the executive member of Pakistan Movement committee working under Muhammad Ali Jinnah. She also served as economic adviser to Jinnah's Pakistan Movement Committee and later became First Lady of Pakistan when her husband Liaqat Khan Ali became Pakistan's first prime minister.  rana liaqat ali khan as First Lady of Pakistan, she launched programs for woman's development in the newly founded country. Later, she would start her career as a stateswoman that would last a decade.

In the 1970s, she joined hands with Zulfikar Ali Bhutto's political movement and joined the socialist government of Zulfikar Ali Bhutto, elected prime minister at that time. She was one of the most trusted and close government and economical advisers to Bhutto and his government, and had played influential role and involved with many key economical decisions taken by Zulfikar Ali Bhutto. Zulfikar Ali Bhutto led the appointment of Ra'ana as the Governor of Sindh Province, and she took the oath on 15 February 1973. Ra'ana was the first woman Governor of Sindh as well as first Chancellor of University of Karachi. In 1977, Ra'ana along with Bhutto and his party, and won the parliamentary elections of 1977, but did not take the gubernatorial office due to martial law imposed by General Zia-ul-Haq, Chief of Army Staff of Pakistan Army. Ra'ana went on to work and dedicated her life for the social and economic benefit of women of Pakistan till her death in 1990. She died in 1990 due to cardiac arrest and was buried in Karachi, with full state and military honours given to her in her funeral. Because of her services and efforts for medical and woman development and woman empowerment, Ra'ana is commonly known as "Māder-e-Pakistan" (English translation: Mother of Pakistan).

Biography

Early life and education
Sheila Irene Pant was born in Almora, Kumaon in 1905 in a Brahmin family that had adopted Christianity. In 1930 she converted to Islam hence changing her name from 'Irene' to Ra,naa (Gul-i-Rana). She attended the University of Lucknow, where in 1927 she was awarded a BA degree in Economics and a Bachelor of Theology in Religious Studies. In 1929, she obtained a double MSc in Economics and Sociology. She began her career as a teacher in the Gokhale Memorial School after completing the Teachers Diploma Course from the Diocesan College, Calcutta. She was appointed as Professor of Economics at Indraprastha College, Delhi, in 1931 and met Liaqat Ali Khan in the same year when he visited to deliver a lecture on law. The couple married in 1932. At this time, she converted to Islam and took the name Begum Ra'ana Liaqat Ali Khan. After the reorganisation of the Muslim League, Begum Ra'ana devoted herself to the task of creating political consciousness amongst the Muslim women society of the British Indian Empire. During this time, Ra'anna became an executive member of Jinnah's Working Committee and served there as economical adviser. Her struggle for emancipation and support for Pakistan continued till the creation of Pakistan for Muslims of India in 1947.

Pakistan Movement

With her husband, Ra'ana strongly opposed the Simon Commission. While a Professor of Economics, Ra'ana intensely mobilised students from her college and went to the Legislative Assembly to hear her husband's debate carrying placards of "Simon Go Home". With Liaquat Ali Khan winning the debate, she became an instant hero with her friends. She later sold him a ticket to a stage show to raise funds for flood relief in Bihar. Ra'ana proved to be Liaquat Ali Khan's constant partner and companion. She became politically involved with her husband and played a major role in the Pakistan Movement. She became a defining moment in Pakistan's history when she accompanied her husband to London, United Kingdom in May 1933. There, she and Khan met with Jinnah at Hamstead Heath residence, and successfully convinced Jinnah to return to the British Indian Empire to resume the leadership of the All India Muslim League. Jinnah returned to India, and Ra'ana was appointed as an executive member of the Muslim League and the Chairperson of the Economic Division of the Party.

In 1942, when it became apparent that Imperial Japan was near attacking India, Jinnah summoned Ra'ana said to her "Be prepared to train the women. Islam doesn't want women to be shut up and never see fresh air". To undertake this task, Ra'ana organised Muslim women in the same year, when she formed a small volunteer medical corps for nursing and first aid in Delhi. Begum Ra'ana played an important role in creating political awareness among women. Ra'ana was among the aspiring women in South Asia and encouraged hundreds of women to fight for Pakistan shoulder-to-shoulder with men.

First Lady

Ra'ana was the first First Lady of Pakistan. As First Lady, she initiated reforms for woman and child development and social progress of women, and played a major role for women's part in Pakistan's politics. After the assassination of her husband Liaquat Ali Khan in 1951, Begum Ra'ana continued her services for the social and economic benefit of women of Pakistan till her death in 1990. One of the daunting challenges for her was to organise health services for women and children migrating from India to Pakistan.

In 1947, as the refugees poured in from across the border, amidst the most pitiable of conditions with cholera, diarrhoea and smallpox being common sights everywhere, she called upon women to come forward and collect food and medical supplies from government offices. The women came forward despite the resistance they faced from certain sections of society, including certain newspapers where they were attacked in the most vicious manner by elements that did not want women to come out from their "four walls". She firmly believed that for a society to do justice to itself, it was pertinent that women played their due role in reforming society alongside the men.

During this point in Pakistan's history there weren't many nurses in Karachi, so Begum Liaquat asked the army to train women to give injections and first aid. Women were thus trained in three to six-month courses and as such the para-military forces for women were formed. The Pakistan Army quickly established Army Medical Corps and recruited a large number of women nurses as army nurses. During this period, girls were also personally encouraged by Begum Liaquat to take up nursing as a profession. They were also taught the rifle drill, to decode ciphers, typing and a host of other duties so they could be useful in times of national crisis like the refugee crisis of 1947.

Initiatives for women
Ra'ana founded the Women's National Guard (PWNG), and helped established the Women's Naval Reserves in the Navy, and was appointed as the Chief Controller. For her immense services to the military as a civilian, the Pakistan Army notably appointed her as the first woman Brigadier, and an honorary uniform was issued especially for her. The Pakistan Woman National Guard was intended to fight for women's rights and aimed to prevent brutal treatment of women, either received from their spouses or caused by domestic violence. At first, the organisation was successful and took strong initiatives in West-Pakistan to lower the rate of violence against women, as she was the organisation's president. But after her husband's death, Ra'ana left Pakistan as she was appointed Pakistan's Ambassador to the Netherlands. Following her departure, the Pakistan Women National Guard was soon disbanded due to financial distress and the government's apathy. However, the Pakistan Woman Naval Reserves still continues as of today where many women joined the Navy through this program. The program has lasting effects in Pakistan's Armed Forces, and the Army and Air Force later established a Woman Reserves program as part of her vision.

Establishment of APWA
In 1949, Begum Ra'ana arranged a conference of over 100 active women from all over Pakistan. The conference announced the formation of a voluntary and non-political organisation for the social, educational and cultural uplift of the women, named All Pakistan Women's Association (APWA). She was nominated as its first president and unlike Pakistan Women National Guard, the APWA continued to grow as it continuously fought for women's rights in Pakistan. For its services, the Government of Pakistan established APWA College in Lahore as part of its struggle.

Career as stateswoman 

After her husband's death, Ra'ana went on to start her career as a stateswoman that lasted more than 2 decades. In 1952, Ra'ana was the first Muslim woman delegate to the United Nations. In 1954, the Government of Pakistan had appointed her as Pakistan's Ambassador to the Netherlands, and also was the first woman ambassador of Pakistan. She represented Pakistan in the Netherlands until 1961 and was also the doyen of the Diplomatic Corps. In June 1966, she was appointed as Pakistan's Ambassador to Italy and stayed there until 1965. Later, she was directed to Tunisia as Pakistan's Ambassador to Tunisia and held this position until March 1966. Following her return to Pakistan, Ra'ana joined Rana Liaquat Ali Khan Government College of Home Economics as Professor of Economics and stayed there until 1973. The Government College University awarded her an honorary doctorate in economics and conferred her with a Doctor of Philosophy in Economics in 1967.

Bhutto's companion
In 1972, as Pakistan was dismembered and going through an intense crisis, Ra'ana joined hands with then-President Zulfikar Ali Bhutto and his political movement, and joined the socialist government of Zulfikar Ali Bhutto. Ra'ana was part of Bhutto's Ministry of Finance and Economics and played a major and influential role in decisions being made concerning economics. Bhutto encouraged her to participate in upcoming elections, and won elections of 1973. Bhutto did not waste time to appoint Ra'ana as Governor of Sindh Province. Ra'ana was the first woman governor of the province of Sindh and the first Chancellor of Sindh University and Karachi University. She continued her term until 1976 when new elections were held. Ra'ana again contested in the 1977 parliamentary elections but did not take the gubernatorial office due to martial law imposed by General Zia-ul-Haq, Chief of Army Staff of the Pakistan Army. She was one of the personalities that argued against the martial law and against the execution of Bhutto. On the day when Bhutto was executed, Ra'ana was reported to be disheartened and emotionally distressed and cried over Bhutto's death for more than three days constantly. Ra'ana launched an anti-Zia campaign and fought against the military government of General Zia-ul-Haq. She single-handedly took on Pakistan's most powerful man, General Zia-ul-Haq, at that time. It was during the 1980s, when she, despite her illness and old age, publicly attacked the general for passing Islamic laws that were contradictory to Islamic teachings and clearly against women. The general, out of respect for her position in society and achievements, decided to leave her alone.

Death

Begum Liaquat died on 13 June 1990 and was buried next to her husband in the precincts of the Quaid-e-Azam's Mausoleum. With her has ended a historic period for the women and youth of Pakistan who, in future generations, will no doubt seek inspiration from Begum Liaquat's life and contributions to the emancipation of women.

Honors and legacy

Ra'ana is considered one of the greatest female leaders Pakistan has produced. In Pakistan, she is given the title of "Mother of Pakistan", received in 1950. Ra'ana continues to be seen as a symbol of selfless service to the cause of humanity and uplift of women. In recognition of her lifelong struggle for women's rights, she was awarded the United Nations Human Rights Award in 1978. Her many other awards and medals include the Jane Adam's Medal in 1950, Woman of Achievement Medal 1950, Mother of Pakistan in 1950, Nishan-i-Imtiaz in 1959, Grand Cross of Orange Nassau in 1961 (the Netherlands), International Gimbel Award 1962, Woman of the World in 1965 chosen by the Turkish Women's Association, Ankara, and Vavaliera di Gran Croce in 1966 (Italy).

 United Nation's Human Rights Award (1978)
 honorary doctorate in Economics (1967)
 Knight Grand Cross of the Order of Merit of the Italian Republic (1 March 1966)
 Woman of the World, Turkish Women's Association (1965)
 Grand Cross of Orange Nassau (1961)
 Nishan-i-Imtiaz (1951)
 Mother of Pakistan in 1950
 Jane Addams Medal in 1950
 Woman of Achievement Medal 1950

Eponymous

Ra'ana Liaquat Ali Khan, Government College of Home Economics (RLAK CHE), Karachi – The economics research institutes of the Government College University established in the 1960s in her honour.
Raana Liaquat Model Colony – a settlement in Karachi named after Ra'ana Liaqat Ali Khan.

Awards and honours
Government of Pakistan honoured her with the highest military honour Nishan-e-Imtiaz.
Queen Juliana of the Netherlands conferred on her the Grand Cross of Orange–Nassau.
Recipient of the International Gimbel Award for service to humanity (1962).
United Nations Prize in the Field of Human Rights for her outstanding contribution to the promotion and protection of the human rights embodied in the Universal Declaration of Human Rights and in other United Nations human rights instruments (1978).

References

External links
Pictures of Begum Ra'ana Liaquat Ali Khan's Visit to the USA 
A Short Biography
Profile of Begum Ra'na Liaquat Ali Khan

Spouses of prime ministers of Pakistan
1905 births
1990 deaths
People from Almora
Pakistani feminists
Pakistani women economists
Leaders of the Pakistan Movement
Rana
All India Muslim League members
Converts to Islam from Christianity
Muhajir people
Kumaoni people
Ambassadors of Pakistan to the Netherlands
Ambassadors of Pakistan to Italy
Ambassadors of Pakistan to Tunisia
University of Lucknow alumni
Pakistani female military officers
Liaquat Ali Khan
Military personnel from Karachi
Politicians from Karachi
Women in war 1900–1945
20th-century Pakistani economists
Knights Grand Cross of the Order of Merit of the Italian Republic
Knights Grand Cross of the Order of Orange-Nassau
Recipients of Nishan-e-Imtiaz
Pakistan Movement activists from the United Provinces
Pakistani women ambassadors
Indian emigrants to Pakistan
National Guard (Pakistan)